Piedmont University is an unaccredited non-profit Christian institution in Los Angeles. It emphasizes preparation for the evangelical ministry, along with education in traditional Asian medicine. It offers the degree programs of Bachelor of Arts in Theology (B.A. Th.), Master of Arts in Missiology (M.A. Miss.), Master of Arts in Church Music (M.A.C.M), Master of Science in Oriental Medicine (M.S.O.M), and Doctor of Ministry (D.Min.).

History
In 2000, Piedmont University was started as a religious school.

In 2011, Piedmont University started a school of business and management, primarily using distant education, offering a Master's of Business Management (MBA) with concentration of studies in both traditional business subjects but also that of Church Management. Also the University plans to open a program in American Business Culture and English in a traditional classroom format.

The school is not accredited, but its programs were listed in the State of California's Bureau for Private Postsecondary and Vocational Education. The president is J. William Stinde, Ph.D. and the chancellor and CEO is Rev. Dr. Sooueng Gan, Th.D., D.D.

See also
 List of unaccredited institutions of higher learning
 Higher education accreditation

References

External links
University web site

Education in Los Angeles
Educational institutions established in 2000
Unaccredited Christian universities and colleges in the United States
Unaccredited institutions of higher learning in California
2000 establishments in California